Port-Salut is an arrondissement in the Sud department of Haiti. As of 2015, the population was 73,845 inhabitants. Postal codes in the Port-Salut Arrondissement start with the number 82.

The arondissement consists of the following communes:
 Port-Salut
 Saint-Jean-du-Sud
 Arniquet

References

Arrondissements of Haiti
Sud (department)